Pleasant Grove Township is a township in Des Moines County, Iowa, United States. The population is 457 with 227 males and 230 females.

Major locations

Churches
Cedar Grove Church
Shaver Church
Agape Fellowship Church

Cemeteries
Wilcox Cemetery
Infant Cemetery

Reservoirs
Sixmile Creek Watershed Site Three Reservoir
Sixmile Creek Watershed Site Two Reservoir
Watson Lake

Creeks
Shaver Creek
Caney Creek
Little Creek

References

Townships in Des Moines County, Iowa
Townships in Iowa